World Airways Flight 30 was a McDonnell Douglas DC-10-30CF airliner which suffered a fatal accident upon landing at Boston Logan International Airport in Boston after departing Newark International Airport in Newark, New Jersey on January 23, 1982. Two of the passengers were never found, and are presumed to have drowned.

Accident

World Airways Flight 30 was a regularly scheduled flight from Oakland to Boston via Newark. The first leg of the flight was uneventful. Flight 30H departed Newark under the command of Captain Peter Langley (58), First Officer Donald Hertzfeld (38), and Flight Engineer William Rogers (56). 

The DC-10 touched down  beyond the displaced threshold. However, the runway was covered in ice, and the braking action was poor to nil (though reported to the pilots as "fair to poor").

When it became apparent that the aircraft was not going to be able to stop on the runway, and since there was insufficient space remaining on the runway to take off again ("touch and go"), the pilots steered the plane off the runway in order to avoid hitting approach lights beyond the runway. The plane then skidded across a field and a taxiway before coming to rest in the  waters of Boston Harbor.

The part of the DC-10 that housed the aircraft cockpit and forward galley separated from the main body of the aircraft, submerging the first row of passenger seats. The three pilots, two flight attendants, and three passengers ended up in the water.  210 passengers and crew, among them documentarian and television show host Justine Shapiro, survived and at first it was thought all on board had survived. Three days later it was discovered that two passengers were missing -- father and son Walter Metcalf, aged 70, and Leo Metcalf, aged 40, who had changed their flight at the last minute and were not on the passenger list. They were two of the three people to fall out of the plane during the crash, and reportedly neither of the two could swim. Divers were sent into the water, but the search proved unsuccessful. A theory for why the bodies haven’t been recovered is that ocean currents have pushed them far away from the airport. As of 2022 neither body has been recovered.

See also 
 Aviation safety
 List of accidents and incidents involving commercial aircraft

References

External links 

 Accident details at planecrashinfo.com

World Airways accidents and incidents
Airliner accidents and incidents caused by ice
1982 meteorology
1982 in Boston
Airliner accidents and incidents in Massachusetts
Aviation accidents and incidents in the United States in 1982
Accidents and incidents involving the McDonnell Douglas DC-10
Logan International Airport
January 1982 events in the United States
Disasters in Boston